Bulaglı may refer to:
 Bulaqlı, a village and municipality in the Sabirabad Rayon of Azerbaijan. 
 Bulagli, a town in the Ararat Province of Armenia.